Owen Manning  (1721–1801) was an English clergyman and antiquarian, known as a historian of Surrey.

Life
Son of Owen Manning of Orlingbury, Northamptonshire, he was born there on 11 August 1721, and received his education at Queens' College, Cambridge, where he graduated B.A. in 1740, M.A. in 1744, and B.D. in 1753. While an undergraduate he nearly succumbed to smallpox. He was elected in 1741 to a fellowship which carried with it the living of St Botolph's Church, Cambridge. He retained both these positions until he married in 1755.

He was chaplain to John Thomas, bishop of Lincoln, who collated him to the prebend of South Scarle in Lincoln Cathedral, 5 August 1757, and on 15 March 1760 to that of Milton Ecclesia, consisting of the impropriation and advowson of the church of Great Milton, Oxfordshire. In 1763 he was presented by Thomas Green, Dean of Salisbury, to the vicarage of Godalming, Surrey, where he lived till his death. In 1769, he was presented by Viscount Midleton to the rectory of Peper Harrow, an adjoining parish.

He was elected Fellow of the Royal Society 10 December 1767, and Fellow of the Society of Antiquaries in 1770. He died at Godalming on 9 September 1801. His parishioners placed a marble tablet to his memory in the church, and some private friends put an inscription on a headstone in the churchyard.

Works
He amassed materials for a history of Surrey, but he did not regard his collections as sufficiently complete for publication, and a total loss of sight prevented him from having them printed under his own care. The manuscripts were eventually entrusted to William Bray, who published them, with additions and a continuation of his own, for the benefit of Manning's widow. The work appeared under the title of The History and Antiquities of the County of Surrey, with a facsimile Copy of Domesday, engraved on thirteen Plates, three  volumes, London, 1804–9–14. There appeared at London in 1819 The Ecclesiastical Topography of the County of Surrey, containing Views of Churches in that County (to illustrate Manning and Bray's History of Surrey), drawn by Hill and engraved by Peak.

Manning completed the Saxon dictionary of his friend Edward Lye, and published it. He also translated and annotated ‘The Will of King Alfred,’ from the original in Thomas Astle's library; this was printed in 1788, under the editorship of Sir Herbert Croft.

Family
By Catherine, his wife, daughter of Reade Peacock, an Alderman  of Huntingdon, he had three sons and five daughters, all of whom survived him except George Owen Manning, his eldest son (B.A. of Queens' College, Cambridge, 1778), and one of the daughters, who died young.

References

Attribution

1721 births
1801 deaths
18th-century English Anglican priests
Alumni of Queens' College, Cambridge
Fellows of Queens' College, Cambridge
English antiquarians
18th-century antiquarians
Fellows of the Royal Society
Fellows of the Society of Antiquaries of London